Fleetwood is an Anglo-Swedish Baronial family.

The lineage was introduced with number 49 in the House of Nobility (Sweden), also known as the Riddarhuset.

English origins

Descent and claims 
The House was founded in the 14th century by William Fleetwood from whom all members descend. Married to Gwlladis in 1320, only daughter and heir to Meredith, son of Canuan, son of Conan, son of Owain Gwynedd. The later, was King of Gwynedd and reigned in 1137 to his death in Nov. 1169 with Gwladys ap Llywarch, a daughter and heir of L'Loworth.

Rise to wealth
As such, the English family originates in Heskin, Lancashire, but it was of little importance until the 16th century, when Thomas Fleetwood (of the Vache) and his three brothers moved south. The eldest, John Fleetwood, a clerk of Chancery by 1535, acquired a large estate mainly in Staffordshire and Lancashire, in each of which counties he was twice High sheriff, and of the two others the elder, Edmund Fleetwood, entered the Charterhouse at Sheen and the younger, Robert Fleetwood, became a Clerk of the Petty Bag and was father of William Fleetwood, Recorder of London.

Family lines
A genealogy chart perused by William Segar, Garter Principal King of Arms, on June 19, 1632, is kept in deposit by the Nordic Museum. It depicts lineal descents and portrays the Achievement (heraldry) of Sir George Fleetwood (Swedish general), Edward Fleetwood of Penwortham and Sir William Fleetwood of Misseden.

An excerpt below starting on Edward Fleetwood (1466-).

 Edward Fleetwood (1466-) married Elisabeth (1468-), daughter to Roger of Holland of Upholland (1418-1494). 
 William Fleetwood of Hesketh married  Ellenor, daughter to Robert Standish
John Fleetwood (1516-1591) married  Joane (1528-1607), daughther to Thomas Langton, Baron of Walton and Lord of Newton (1497-1569)
 Richard Fleetwood of Penwortham, married Margery daughter to Sir Thomas Leigh of Eginton. 
 Edward Fleetwood of Penwortham, married Margery eldest daughter to William Norreys. With issue.
 Richard Fleetwood, married to Elisabeth daughter to Edmund Trafford. With issue.
 Sir Thomas Fleetwood, Attorney General to Prince Henry, son of James I. Clerk of the Petty Bag. Married the daughter of Richard Sherborn.
 William Fleetwood, Cup bearer to James I and Charles I, married Dorothye, daughter to Sir William Cockayne. With issue.
 Sir Richard Fleetwood, 1st Baronet of Caldwick, married Anne, daughther to Sir John Penhall. With issue.
 Thomas Fleetwood of the Vache in Chalfont 1518-1570  married Barbara Andrews (1525-) then Bridget daughter to Robert Spring.
 Edvard Fleetwood of Rossall Hall married Christina daughther to Paul Wentworth. With issue to be the baronets of Rossall Hall
 Sir William Fleetwood of Cranford, married Jane daughter to Sir Gervase Clifton of Clifton.
 Sir Miles Fleetwood of Aldwinkle, married Anne daughter to Sir Nicholas Luke.
Sir William Fleetwood  of High Lodge, Woodstock Park. Married Francis daughter to Henry Steere, Esquire. With issue.
Lord Charles Fleetwood (c. 1618–1692), was a Parliamentary soldier and politician, Lord Deputy of Ireland. Married Birdget, daughter to Oliver Cromwell, Lord Protector of the Commonwealth of England, Scotland and Ireland.
 Sir George Fleetwood Introduced in Sweden's Riddarhuset as a Baron. Married Brigitta Gÿllenstierna, with issue.
 Sir George Fleetwood of the Vache, married Katherine sister to the Earl of Norwich. With issue.
 Lord Bishop James Fleetwood
 Robert Fleetwood Clerk of the Petty Bag
William Fleetwood Recorder of London.
Sir William Fleetwood of Misseden, married Anne daughter to Robert barton of Smythels. 
Lord Bishop William Fleetwood.

Swedish nobility

Riddarhuset

Sir George was knighted 3 June 1632 by the Swedish king Gustav II Adolf; created Swedish Baron 1 June 1654 at Uppsala Castle by Queen Christina of Sweden, and was introduced into the Riddarhuset on 19 June 1654 as Baronial family N:o 49 with the following Blazon:

Descendants of George Fleetwood, the Swedish general and baron, include the former member of the Swedish parliament, Riksdagen Elisabeth Fleetwood and William Fleetwood, painter.

See also
 Fleetwood baronets
 Fleetwood coastal town
 HMS Fleetwood

Notes

References

 Cohn, Ronald: Swedish Heraldry, Säarbrucken Boockvika Publishing (english)
 Dahlby, Frithiof: Svensk heraldisk uppslagsbok, Stockolm, Bonniers 1964
 Boneauschiold, Gustav: Sweriges Rikes ridderskaps och adels wapenbok Stockolm, Lars Salvio, 1940
 Linnaeus, Folke: Swedish Nobility, Stockolm, Hepphaestus Boocks (Amazon) 2011
 Stjernstedt, AW Sveriges ridderskaps och adels wapenbok (escudos de armas de los caballeros y la nobleza sueca). Estocolmo, Suecia: Lewertin y Sjöstedt, 1865-187
 Wasling, Jesper: Svenska Herladiska for Föreningen, skriftserie. 48 Utgivningsår: 2005

Swedish noble families
European families of English ancestry